Meropleon diversicolor, the multicolored sedgeminer moth, is a moth of the family Noctuidae. It is found in North America, where it has been recorded from Connecticut, Georgia, Indiana, Iowa, Kansas, Kentucky, Maine, Maryland, Massachusetts, Michigan, Minnesota, New Brunswick, New Hampshire, New Jersey, North Carolina, Ohio, Oklahoma, Ontario, Pennsylvania, Quebec, South Carolina, Tennessee and Wisconsin. The habitat consists of wetlands.

The wingspan is about 29 mm. The inner half of the forewings is mostly dark grey-brown, while the outer half is mostly white. The basal area is beige to dark grey-brown, darkest toward the inner margin. There is a double antemedial line, filled with whitish. The postmedial line is whitish and the subterminal area is shaded with light greyish brown. The terminal line consists of a series of dark dashes. Adults have been recorded on wing from June to October, with most records in August and September.

The larvae bore into sedges.

References

Moths described in 1875
Hadeninae
Moths of North America